Anno 1696 is the ninth studio album by Finnish melodic death metal band Insomnium, released on 24 February 2023 via Century Media. Insomnium began working on the album shortly before the release of Argent Moon, in 2021, with the album originally planned to be released in 2022. Like their 2016 album Winter's Gate, the album is based on a short story by vocalist/bassist Niilo Sevänen, first hinted on October 24, 2022, less than two weeks before the album's official announcement.

In April 2023, the band will embark on a massive North American tour to promote Anno 1696, together with Enslaved, whose album Heimdal is scheduled for release a week after the release of Anno 1696, with support from Black Anvil.

Track listing

Personnel

Insomnium
 Niilo Sevänen – bass, lead vocals
 Ville Friman – guitars, clean vocals
 Markus Vanhala – guitars
 Jani Liimatainen – guitars, clean vocals
 Markus Hirvonen – drums

Additional musician
 Sakis Tolis – guest vocals (track 2)
 Johanna Kurkela – guest vocals (track 3)
 Coen Janssen – keyboards

Production and design
 Insomnium – production
 Teemu Aalto – recording (acoustic guitars, bass, vocals)
 Jaime Gomez Arellano – recording (drums, acoustic guitars), mixing
 Coen Janssen – recording (keyboards)
 Ville Friman – recording (electric guitars)
 Markus Vanhala – recording (electric guitars)
 Jani Liimatainen – recording (electric guitars)
 Tony Lindgren – mastering
 Sami Makkonen – artwork
 Terhi Ylimäinen – photography
 hafensatz.de – layout

Charts

References

2023 albums
Century Media Records albums
Insomnium albums